Marquis Xian of Jin, ancestral name Ji (姬), given name Su (蘇), was the eighth ruler of the state of Jin during the Western Zhou Dynasty. After his father, Marquis Xi of Jin died in 823 BC, he ascended the throne of Jin.

In 812 BC, the 11th year of his reign, he died and his son Feiwang, ascended the throne as the next ruler of Jin: Marquis Mu of Jin.

Monarchs of Jin (Chinese state)
812 BC deaths
9th-century BC Chinese monarchs
Year of birth unknown